Fanny Wallace Tewksbury (1852-1934) was an American painter.

Biography
Tewksbury was born in 1852 in Boston, Massachusetts.

Tewksbury exhibited her work at the Palace of Fine Arts at the 1893 World's Columbian Exposition in Chicago, Illinois. She was a member of the Brooklyn Art Association, the New York Watercolor Society, the National Association of Women Painters and Sculptors, and the Woman's Art Club of New York.

She died in 1934.

References

External link
 

1852 births    
1934 deaths
Artists from Boston
19th-century American women artists
20th-century American women artists